Theodore Benedict Lyman (November 27, 1815 – December 13, 1893), was the fourth Bishop of the Episcopal Diocese of North Carolina.

Biography
He was born in Brighton, Massachusetts on November 27, 1815. He was the father of William Whittingham Lyman. He was educated at Hamilton College and General Theological Seminary. He was ordained deacon on September 20, 1840, and priest on December 19, 1841, for the Diocese of Maryland and served as rector of Saint John's Church at Hagerstown, Maryland. In 1850 he moved to Pittsburgh. He spent some time traveling around Europe and the Middle East He also served as chaplain at the Embassy of the United States, Rome. He returned to the United States in 1870 became rector of Trinity Church in San Francisco. Lyman  was one of the founders of Saint James School in Maryland, which became one of the great Church schools in the United States and from which schools such as St. Paul's, Concord NH, St. Mark's, Southborough, and others were founded. He was elected Coadjutor Bishop of North Carolina bishop in 1973. He was consecrated on December 11, 1873, by Bishop Thomas Atkinson of North Carolina in Christ Church, Raleigh, North Carolina. After his death at age seventy-eight, he was interred in Oakwood Cemetery, Raleigh; in 1914 he was reinterred in the Church of the Good Shepherd, Raleigh.

References

External links
Bibliographic directory on Theodore Benedict Lyman from Project Canterbury

1821 births
1893 deaths
Episcopal Church in North Carolina
19th-century American Episcopalians
Episcopal bishops of North Carolina
19th-century American clergy